The Slovakia Summit 2005 was a summit meeting between United States President George W. Bush and Russian President Vladimir Putin (hence also known as the Bush-Putin summit). It took place on February 24, 2005, in Bratislava, Slovakia. This marked the first occasion when a sitting President of the United States visited Slovakia since its independence in 1993. The previous "Bush-Putin summit" had taken place in Slovenia on 16 June 2001.

Also attending was Condoleezza Rice (U.S. Secretary of State) and Sergey Lavrov (Russian Foreign Minister) as well as the first ladies of both countries, Laura Bush and Liudmila Putina.

Bush's European trip before the summit
Prior to the summit, Bush had traveled to Brussels and met with several European leaders and councils of the European Union and NATO, including Tony Blair, Silvio Berlusconi, Jacques Chirac, and Javier Solana. He also met with Viktor Yushchenko, the new President of Ukraine, and gave a public speech directed at citizens of Europe outlining his policies. He then travelled to Germany and met with Gerhard Schröder. In preparation for the summit, Condoleezza Rice spent a week visiting officials in European capitals.

The summit

Bush met with Slovak leaders including President Ivan Gašparovič and Prime Minister Mikuláš Dzurinda. On 24 February Bush also gave a public speech in Hviezdoslav Square (Hviezdoslavovo námestie) in Bratislava.

Topics of discussion at the summit are partly private, but included Russian democracy (this was the main topic at the subsequent press conference), the situation in Iran, the North Korean nuclear talks and other international topics. One of the objects of the summit activities was to improve relations between the U.S. and Europe. Notably, Slovakia is an ally of the U.S. in the Iraq War and contributed troops to the Coalition of the willing.

In conjunction with the summit, a conference, "A New Quest for Democracy", was held in Bratislava by the Marshall Fund in conjunction with Slovak partners, to which mainly past or contemporaneous "fighters" for democracy from Eastern Europe (incl. Belarus, Serbia etc.) were invited. 

Both first ladies visited the famous Primate's Palace. The US first lady opened a department of the University Library in Bratislava (which was being restored and modernized at that time) that was devoted to US literature and studies. The Russian first lady opened a similar department for Russian literature in the same library one day later.

Among other things, Bush promised that US administration will prepare a "road map" for Slovakia (and probably also the neighbouring Central European countries) aiming at abolishing the need of US entrance visa for the citizens of Slovakia and those countries.

Approximate program
23 February
 7.40 pm – Bush's landing at M. R. Štefánik Airport
24 February
 c. 9.00 am – Bush, President's palace
 9.50 am – Bush, The Slovak Republic Government Office
 11.45 am – Bush's speech, Hviezdoslav Square, in front of the Slovak National Theatre
 afternoon – Vladimir Putin's landing at M. R. Štefánik Airport
 c. 3.30 pm – Putin and Bush, Bratislava Castle, press conference at c. 6.00 pm  
 c. 7.30 pm – Bush's take off from M. R. Štefánik Airport
25 February
 c. 9.30 am – Putin, Slavín Memorial, meeting with Slovak and Russian World War II veterans
 c. 10.00 am – Putin, National Council of the Slovak Republic
 c. 11.15 am – Putin, The Slovak Republic Government Office
 c. 12.40 pm – Putin, President's palace
 c. 4.00 pm – Putin's take off from M. R. Štefánik Airport

Security
Safety was the pinnacle of concerns for all participants. The Slovak Army and Slovak government had pledged their full resources for the security of each individual. Among the resources being deployed were:
5,300 policemen 
400 soldiers 
SA-10 Grumble – an anti-aircraft missile system on alert 
chemical laboratory – standing by in case of a chemical attack
permanent air surveillance by Mig-29s over Bratislava
the Slovak government prepared a law under which the minister of defense can approve shootings down of a civilian aircraft

Common safety steps
more security controls at General M. R. Štefánik Airport, Bratislava
traffic restrictions; no thoroughfare for lorry above 3.5 tons at frontier crossing since Wednesday until Friday
Bratislava, ironically called "Fort Bratislava" at that time, consisted of three security zones (Bratislava Castle, Hviezdoslav Square, President's palace), each zone was divided into three circles (yellow – controlled space, green – more controlled space and red – restricted space)

See also
 Russia–United States relations
 List of Soviet Union–United States summits
 Slovenia Summit 2001

References

2005 conferences
2005 in international relations
2005 in American politics
2000s in Russian politics
2005 in Slovakia
21st-century diplomatic conferences
Diplomatic conferences in Slovakia
Russia–United States relations
Slovakia–United States relations
Russia–Slovakia relations
Presidency of George W. Bush
Vladimir Putin
2000s in Bratislava
Events in Bratislava
February 2005 events in Europe